Monte Sant'Elia is an Italian mountain in Palmi, Calabria.

Apennine Mountains
Mountains of Calabria